Sirutiškis is a village in Kėdainiai district municipality, in Kaunas County, in central Lithuania. According to the 2011 census, the village has a population of 370 people. It is located 1 km from the Kėdainiai city northern limit (Babėnai), on the right bank of the Nevėžis river, nearby its tributary Baltupis mouth. The regional road  Kėdainiai-Krekenava-Panevėžys runs through the village.

There are a manor palace with a park, library, gravel pit in Sirutiškis.

History
The name Sirutiškis comes from Simonas Sirutis, who was a castellan of Vitebsk and around 1760 had the Sirutiškis manor as an own property. At the 19th century, the manor was a property of the Komarowski family. 

Beržytė village was merged with Sirutiškis in 1968.

Demography

Images

References

Villages in Kaunas County
Kėdainiai District Municipality